Lee Myeong-keon (born 27 July 1994) is a South Korean footballer currently playing as a midfielder.

Career statistics

Club

Notes

References

1994 births
Living people
South Korean footballers
Association football midfielders
K League 1 players
Korea National League players
Pohang Steelers players